Liu Yong (born February, 1949) is a Chinese educator, novelist, painter, and philanthropist. He founded the Shui Yun Zhai Cultural Enterprises and has built over 40 schools in rural China.

He has written over 100 books that range from non-fiction essays to novels. Liu is a best-selling author in Mainland China and Taiwan., and his books have been translated into English, Korean, Vietnamese, and Thai. Liu has toured Mainland China, Taiwan, Malaysia, and Singapore to speak on educational topics. 

Liu has held over 30 solo exhibitions, and his paintings have been collected by museums across Asia and Europe. Sotheby’s, which regularly auctions his works, describes his unique style as the combination of utilizing ancient techniques, developing a contemporary manner, and contemplating philosophical thoughts. He commonly uses fine lines and delicate brushstrokes to depict landscapes, birds, and flowers.

Early life and career

Liu Yong was born and raised in Taipei. His father passed away when he was 9 years old. He graduated from Cheng Kung Senior High School, obtained a Bachelor's degree in Fine Arts from National Taiwan Normal University, obtained a Master's degree in East Asian Studies from St. John's University (Jamaica, NY), and pursued a Doctorate degree in Art Education from Columbia University. 

Liu won first place in the fine arts department exhibition at National Taiwan Normal University, and became an art teacher at Cheng Kung Senior High School upon graduation in 1972. He was invited to participate in the Asia Contemporary Art Exhibition at age 23 and the National Art Exhibition at age 25. 

From November 30, 1971 to April 5, 1974, Liu hosted the prime-time China Television quiz show "Seconds Count Down". From 1973 to 1977, he worked as a reporter and producer for China Television in Taipei. In 1978, he represented China Television in the U.S. and became the artist-in-residence at the Danville Museum of Fine Arts and History in Virginia. In 1980, he became the artist-in-residence at St. John's University (Jamaica, NY). In 1991, Taiwan’s public television station commissioned Liu to produce the documentary series, “The Spirit of Chinese Culture.” At the same time, he founded Shui Yun Zhai Cultural Enterprises in Taipei, which he continues to manage, in addition to working as a professional writer and artist.

Artistic style

Liu was an apprentice of Huang Jun-Bi and Lin Yushan, artists of landscape, bird, and flower paintings. He imitated classical masterpieces in the National Palace Museum. His foundation, combined with education in Western painting from studying in the U.S., clear sketching technique, and background in literature led to the development of his style. 

Liu’s landscape paintings have been described as “Dreamscape” by American media for their three-dimensional quality. The style merges his self-invented technique of spraying ink onto wrinkled paper collages, the boneless strokes of bird and flower painting, texture strokes inspired by old Chinese masters, and sometimes his own form of Pointillism inspired by Impressionism. 

Liu’s bird and flower paintings present the subjects with scientific accuracy. Liu hopes that viewers can “live, play, and listen” in his paintings because every work has a story, just like in literature. Liu’s painting and writing are very much interconnected, and critics often praise his art for embodying the essence of poetry.

Liu has become one of the few living Chinese painters to be included in Sotheby’s and Christie’s auctions in Hong Kong, Beijing, and New York. Numerous books have been published about his artwork, theory, and techniques. Notably, People's Fine Arts Publishing House published a book on Liu Yong in their prestigious “Chinese Contemporary Famous Artists” series.

Selected solo exhibitions
2019: Baoku Jiangxin Art Center, Shanghai, China
2018: Liaoning Provincial Museum, Shenyang, China
2017: Zhejiang Art Museum, Hangzhou, China
2015: Art Museum of Beijing Fine Art Academy, Beijing, China
2015: Silicon Valley Asian Art Center, Santa Clara, CA
2011: Gallery at National Dr. Sun Yat-Sen Memorial Hall, Taipei, Taiwan ROC
2010: Xi Zhi Tang Gallery, Taipei, Taiwan ROC
1990: Taipei Arts Center, Taipei, Taiwan ROC
1989: Xin Sheng Gallery, Taipei, Taiwan ROC
1982: Long-Men Gallery, Taipei, Taiwan ROC
1982: Today Gallery, Taipei, Taiwan ROC
1981: Chung-Cheng Art Gallery at St. John’s University, Queens, NY
1980: Print Gallery, Blacksburg, VA
1979: Washington and Lee University Gallery, Lexington, VA
1978: Danville Museum of Fine Arts and History, Danville, VA
1978: Rechenbach’s Gallery, Knoxville, TN
1978: People’s Market Art Gallery, Greenville, SC
1978: Mall Art Gallery, Norfolk, VA
1978: Quayside Gallery, Norfolk, VA
1977: National Taiwan Museum, Taipei, Taiwan ROC

Selected group exhibitions
2021: Commemorating Dwelling in the Fuchun Mountains, Gongwang Art Museum, Hangzhou, China
2021: When Literature Meets Aesthetics, Chang Ge Gallery, Taipei, Taiwan ROC
2021: Welcoming Spring, Chang Ge Gallery, Taipei, Taiwan ROC
2019: Cross-Strait Art Exhibition, National Chiang Kai-Shek Memorial Hall, Taipei, Taiwan ROC
2016: Chinese Contemporary Famous Artists, Silicon Valley Asian Art Center, Santa Clara, CA
2016: 100 Years of Chinese Art, Shandong Art Museum, Jinan, China
2014: Asia-Pacific Economic Cooperation (APEC), International Conference Center, Beijing, China
2013: The Pacific—Innovation of Chinese Ink Paintings in America, Zhejiang Art Museum, Hangzhou, China
2013: Beautiful Taiwan—Classic Works of Taiwan’s Contemporary Artists, National Art Museum of China, Beijing, China
2013: Beautiful Taiwan—Classic Works of Taiwan’s Contemporary Artists, China Art Museum, Shanghai, China
2011: 100 Years 100 Paintings—Taiwanese Contemporary Artists Exhibition, General Association of Chinese Culture, Taipei, Taiwan ROC
2009: Open Flexibility—Innovative Contemporary Ink Art, Taipei Fine Arts Museum, Taipei, Taiwan ROC
2007: The Third Chengdu Biennale: New Trend of Contemporary Ink Painting—Ink Works from Taiwan, Chengdu Contemporary Art Museum, Chengdu, China
1993: Chinese Modern Colour-and-Ink Painting Exhibition, Russian Museum of Ethnography, St. Petersburg, Russia
1993: Great Contemporary Art Exhibition, Gallery at National Chiang Kai-Shek Memorial Hall, Taipei, Taiwan ROC
1986: 21st Annual Sumi-e Society of America Exhibition, Salmagundi Club, New York, NY
1984: Overseas Chinese Artists, Taipei Fine Arts Museum, Taipei, Taiwan ROC
1978: Chinese Paintings, Museum für Ostasiatische Kunst, Cologne, Germany
1977: Chinese Modern Art Exhibition, Museum of Science and Industry, Los Angeles, CA

Selected public and private collections
Chiang Kai-shek Memorial Hall, Taipei, Taiwan ROC
Knoxville City Hall, Knoxville, Tennessee, USA
Liaoning Provincial Museum, Shenyang, China
Museum für Ostasiatische Kunst, Cologne, Germany
National Museum of History, Taipei, Taiwan ROC
National Taiwan Museum of Fine Arts, Taichung, Taiwan ROC
Sun Yat-sen Memorial Hall (Taipei), Taipei, Taiwan ROC
Washington and Lee University, Lexington, Virginia, USA
Zhejiang Art Museum, Hangzhou, China
Stanley Ho Family Collection
Liu Yiqian, China

TV shows
China Television quiz show "Seconds Count Down" (Show time: November 30, 1971 ~ April 5, 1974)
China Television politics show "Current Event Forum" (1976), received the Golden Bell Award of TV
China Television cultural show "Window of Music" (1976), won Best Music Program at the International Film and Television Festival in New York
Phoenix Television talk show "Speaking of the World from the Heart" (2008)
Taiwan Public Television educational show "Chinese Characters Are Fun" (2015)

See also
Taiwanese art
Culture of Taiwan
Fine Arts

References

Book Review:Discovering the Truth of Life
SYZ Studios by Liu Yong
Shui Yun Zhai Cultural Enterprises
Liu Yong Artron Page

External links
Official Website in English: SYZ Studios by Liu Yong
Official Website in Chinese: Shui Yun Zhai Cultural Enterprises
Official Artron Website in Chinese

1949 births
Living people
Artists from Taipei
Columbia University alumni
National Taiwan Normal University alumni
St. John's University (New York City) alumni
Taiwanese male novelists
Taiwanese painters
Writers from Taipei